Lake Kitkajärvi is a rather large lake of Finland. It is situated partly in Posio in Lapland region and partly in Kuusamo municipality in Northern Ostrobothnia region, and it belongs to the Koutajoki main catchment area. The southern part of the lake is called Yli-Kitka (meaning Upper Kitka) and northern part is called Ala-Kitka (meaning Lower Kitka). Kitkajärvi is 14th biggest lake in Finland. It is also the biggest unregulated lake, because there is not any power stations in the outflow. Rather big part of the lake is protected in the Natura 2000 protection program. The water in the lake is very clean. There is a route around the lake for paddlers.

See also
List of lakes in Finland
 Posiolapland.com - Posio Tourism

References

Lakes of Kuusamo
Lakes of Posio